Hellenistic fortifications are defense structures constructed during the Hellenistic Period of ancient Greek civilization (323 - ca. 30 B.C.E.). These included fortification walls, towers, and gates. Expansion of Greek territory during the Hellenistic Period from Alexander the Great's conquests created the necessity to build new fortifications with new settlements. This, combined with developing military technology, led to changes in style of architecture specific to the Hellenistic Period.

Historical Chronology 
The Hellenistic Period was the period in Ancient Greek civilization from 323 - ca. 30 B.C.E.. It is marked by the death of Alexander the Great and ends with the rise of the Roman Empire. The period follows the conquests of Alexander the Great spreading Greek territory far into Egypt, Asia Minor, and the Middle East. The Hellenistic Period saw Greek territorial expansion at its greatest. Acquisition of new territory led to the movement of Greek people and influence throughout the Mediterranean. It also allowed for the rise of new cities. With a huge territory, being "Greek" became less of a geographic locator, and more a representation of personal cultural ties. Therefore architecture built during this time developed both a mix of canonical Greek elements and locally indigenous styles.

Fortification walls 

The buildup of new cities required the build up of fortification walls. Fortification walls served multiple purposes for the Greeks. They served as a means of protection from invasion and as markers of territory. Walls were first constructed around the city's Acropolis, to ensure the safety of the most important part of Greek society—their sacred space. The extent to which the defensive walls protected only the city-center, or spread into the countryside, varied. The intensity of defense measures depended on a city's vulnerability and likelihood of attack.

Therefore, it was common to see Greek civilizations purposefully located at naturally defensible locations such as mountains and rivers. These natural barriers sometimes prevented the need to build fortifications. Choosing geography as a means of defense only increased during the Hellenistic period with the development of colonies. When specifically looking to where to build a new city, rulers chose locations with defense in mind. An example of this can be seen at Mount Oreion, Corinthia. Located on the important Corinthian isthmus, the Mount Oreion mountain range provided a natural barrier for the city. In low sloping planes, such as the sites of Stanotopi and Maritsa, walls were constructed to add to protection.

Towers  
Towers provided a variety of purposes for the Greeks. They were a place to store military supplies and provide lookouts out over the fortification walls. In the Hellenistic Period, there was a shift in the construction and placement of towers. This is due to the increasing necessity to have what would be the strongest defensive line. Prior to the Hellenistic Period, towers were largely simple, single-storied square buildings. Due to advances in military technology this style of tower changed. The creation of the cannon led to the development of circular or multi-angled towers rather than square shaped. The new shapes made the structure stronger against impact from a cannonball.

At the start of the Hellenistic Period, towers were incorporated into the fortification walls. Moving through the Hellenistic Period, there was a shift to towers being constructed separate from the wall system. Circular or multi-angled towers would have been more difficult to incorporate into the flat-walled architecture. They were also separated due to their vulnerability to attack. If a cannon were to take down a separate tower, it would not effect the defensibility of the walls.

This idea is seen specifically at Alinda, Karia. Original construction had the citadel connected in the city walls. A later construction purposefully brought the citadel outside the city defense fortifications, and away from the city center. This has been hypothesized as a decision to further protect the city, by keeping a potential military target away from the society.

Materials and construction  

Hellenistic fortifications were built out of a variety of materials. The materials largely depended on what could be sourced locally. This provided the cheapest, most abundant option. Most common were ashlar block masonry and mud-brick. However, we also see limestone and stone filled with rubble. Mud-brick was common in colonies located around the Black Sea and Ionia. The process for mud-brick took materials of clay and water and then added sand to strengthen the consistency.

The mixture was then placed in wooden molds and let to dry in the sun. In the Hellenistic period, the use of ashlar block style masonry developed. Here, blocks were evenly cut small and rectangular, to create the strongest individual block. Thus, creating stronger walls and towers. These construction projects were largely financed from public funds, rather than from individual donors as they were a public necessity.

Architecture 
Colonies created during the Hellenistic period held an interesting mix of incorporating both Greek and foreign indigenous styles of Architecture. A majority of settlements around the Black Sea were founded by Miletians, therefore architectural methods and styles of the Miletians were transferred on. But, in these same colonies, there was a sense of needing to legitimize their "Greekness". New rulers wanted to prove that they were just as Greek as cities in mainland Greece. Therefore, many elements found in traditional Greek fortification walls were also seen in colonies far from the mainland.

At the site of Chersonesus, blocks were cut long and flat. Masonries purposefully used a style of untrimming to give a stylistic effect common in Greek cities. In all fortification walls, one continuous idea was all walls were kept relatively low, but powerful from the use of small bricks or ashlar blocks. It was not economically resourceful to create extra-tall or extra-thick walls, when the strength in the stone itself would be defensible on its own. Walls were only made as tall or as thick as they were needed.  Generally, fortifications were simple in design, their purpose was simply to defend, not to necessarily look pretty. However, Chersonesos offers a unique example of Greeks emphasizing aestetical beauty over what was most economical or defensible.

See also 
 Hellenistic armies

References

Ancient Greek fortifications in Greece
Fortifications